William Call was High Sheriff of Essex.

William Call may also refer to:
Sir William Call, 3rd Baronet of the Call baronets
Sir William Call, 4th Baronet of the Call baronets

See also
Call (surname)